Prodegeeria is a genus of flies in the family Tachinidae.

Species
Prodegeeria albicincta (Reinhard, 1924)
Prodegeeria chaetopygialis (Townsend, 1926)
Prodegeeria consobrina (Villeneuve, 1939)
Prodegeeria gracilis Shima, 1979
Prodegeeria japonica (Mesnil, 1957)
Prodegeeria javana Brauer & von Bergenstamm, 1894
Prodegeeria malayana Shima, 1997
Prodegeeria pammelas (Reinhard, 1952)
Prodegeeria residis (Reinhard, 1952)
Prodegeeria straeleni Mesnil, 1952
Prodegeeria tentata (Walker, 1858)

References

Diptera of Asia
Diptera of North America
Exoristinae
Tachinidae genera
Taxa named by Friedrich Moritz Brauer
Taxa named by Julius von Bergenstamm